Tufton Beamish may refer to:
Tufton Percy Hamilton Beamish (1874–1951), Rear Admiral in the Royal Navy and member of Parliament for Lewes (1924–1932 and 1936–1945)
Tufton Beamish, Baron Chelwood of Lewes (1917–1989) son of the above; British Army officer and member of Parliament for Lewes (1945–1974)